Bonita Norris (born 1987) is a British mountaineer. She was the youngest British woman to reach the summit of Mount Everest at the age of 22  from May 2010 until May 2012, when her record was broken by Leanna Shuttleworth, aged 19.

In 2011 Bonita successfully climbed Ama Dablam with Lhakpa Wongchu Sherpa and in 2012, Bonita returned to the Himalayas for her fifth expedition, to attempt Mt. Lhotse, the world's fourth highest mountain. She successfully summited on 28 May 2012, becoming the third British woman to do so.

Expeditions

 Mount Manaslu fore summit, 8163m (2009)
 Mount Everest, 8848m (2010)
 Last degree ski expedition to the geographic North Pole (2011)
 Mount Ama Dablam, 6812m (2011)
 Mount Imja Tse (Island Peak), 6189m (2012)
 Mount Lhotse, 8516m (2012)

In 2016 Bonita attempted to climb the world's second highest peak, K2 in Pakistan but was unsuccessful. There were no summits on the mountain that year.

Memoir

In 2017 Bonita's memoir The Girl Who Climbed Everest was released in hardback by Hodder & Stoughton. The paperback version reached number 1 in the Amazon Mountaineering book chart in 2022.

Charity work

During her Everest expedition, Bonita raised £10,000 for the Global Angels Foundation and during her North Pole ski, £5,000 for the Forces Children's Trust.

Education 

She attended The Holt School, located in Wokingham, Berkshire, England. She went on to study at Royal Holloway, University of London, graduating in 2009 with a BA Media Arts.

Personal life

Bonita has a daughter, Lily and lives in London with her husband, the former competitive climber Adrian Baxter.

See also
Leanna Shuttleworth

References

External links
Mount Everest Bonita Norris Interview

English mountain climbers
British summiters of Mount Everest
Living people
1988 births
Place of birth missing (living people)
People from Wokingham
Female climbers